Reich Star (also known as Reichstar) is a role-playing game set in 2134, published by Creative Encounters in 1990. The game is written and designed by Ken Richardson and edited by Simon Bell.

The RPG had been rumored to be re-released in 2002 with additional works by Ken Richardson and further development of the Italian material. A Japanese source book titled The Empire of Nippon, written by Benjamin Nicholls, was also commissioned by Creative Encounters however although PDF copies have appeared on the internet, it did not enter print. The Empire of Nippon source book brought much of the Nipponese sphere of influence to life with a much more expanded and detailed history of the world up to 2134. Material also includes the vast political makeup of the Empire and the semi-free nations that make up the Asia-Pacific Alliance.

Setting
In an alternate universe, history took a terrifying turn for the worse during World War II, with the Axis Powers conquering the globe. Nearly 200 years later the '"Third Reich" and the "Empire of Nippon" have spread their reach to off-world colonies far beyond our Solar System, enslaving the technologically inferior alien species they have so far encountered, and maneuvering their might against each other in an ever threatening Cold War. In the midst of this darkness many resistance groups have emerged to fight against the Nazi tyranny. The player characters belong to one of these groups, and fight to overthrow the Third Reich and restore freedom and democracy to Erde and her colonies.

Reviews
White Wolf #24 (Dec./Jan., 1990)

References

Science fiction role-playing games
Role-playing games introduced in 1991
Alternate history role-playing games